The Vancouver Film Critics Circle Award for Best Director Canadian Film is an annual award given by the Vancouver Film Critics Circle.

Winners

2000s

2010s

2020s

References

Director of a Canadian Film